Lincoln Minster School (Known locally as "LMS" or "The Minster") is an independent co-educational day and boarding school in Lincoln, England.

It comprises three schools: the nursery and pre-preparatory, preparatory, and senior school. While the school is now open to pupils from the community it continues to educate the choristers of Lincoln Cathedral. It is a member of the United Church Schools Trust and the Choir Schools' Association.

History
In 1265 Richard of Gravesend, Bishop of Lincoln, decreed that there should be twelve boys, two of whom were to be incense bearers, living in one house under a master who appropriated certain revenues for their support. They were to be taught lessons in their house in addition to their choral duties. Even before the Bishop's ordinance, boys were known to have been taught music in the Cathedral Close.

Lincoln Minster School was formed in 1996 with the amalgamation of four schools:

The Cathedral School for the choristers (girls and boys) of Lincoln Minster
St Joseph's School for Girls, a day and boarding school
Stonefield House School which taught children up to the age of 16

In 2011 St Mary's Preparatory School merged with the school to become its preparatory department.

Music
Non-chorister pupils are encouraged to be involved in music. There are opportunities to perform in school concerts or lead worship services. Many are selected for the National Youth Choirs of Great Britain, National Children's Orchestra and other groups.

Choir
In 1995, the Lincoln Cathedral became the third English cathedral (after Salisbury and Wakefield Cathedrals) to allow girl choristers. All choristers are educated at the school as scholarship holders. Although "chorister" is a general term, at Lincoln it is reserved for the four senior boys and girls, distinguished by their dark ‘copes’ or cloaks. Boys and girls who have passed their probationary stage are known as 'chanters'.

Boarding
Across all the schools there are four boarding houses:
Hillside (Senior boys)
Lindum View (Junior boys)
Eastgate (Senior Girls)
James Street (Junior boys and girls)

Literature
A detailed history of the Lincoln Grammar School from its foundation to 1902 is provided by: 
Leach A. F. in Page W. (ed), (1906),  The Victoria History of the County of Lincoln Vol II, pp 421–449.

Notable alumni
 Eliza Butterworth, actress - (The Last Kingdom, (2022)

References

External links 
School website
Profile on the ISC website
Profile on the Good Schools Guide
ISI Inspection Reports
Ofsted Social Care Inspection Reports

Private schools in Lincolnshire
Schools in Lincoln, England
Cathedral schools
Choir schools in England
Member schools of the Headmasters' and Headmistresses' Conference
United Learning schools
Church of England private schools in the Diocese of Lincoln